Loco moco is a dish featured in contemporary Hawaiian cuisine. There are many variations, but the traditional loco moco consists of white rice, topped with a hamburger, a fried egg, and brown gravy. Variations may include bacon, ham, Spam, tofu, kalua pork, Portuguese sausage, teriyaki beef, teriyaki chicken, mahi-mahi, shrimp, oysters, and other meats.

History and origin

The dish was reportedly created at the Lincoln Grill restaurants in Hilo, Hawaii, in 1949 by its proprietors, Richard Inouye and his wife, Nancy, at the request of teenagers from the Lincoln Wreckers Sports club seeking something that differed from a sandwich, was inexpensive, and yet could be quickly prepared and served. They asked Nancy to put some rice in a bowl, a hamburger patty over the rice, and then top it with brown gravy. The egg came later. The teenagers named the dish Loco Moco after one of their members, George Okimoto, whose nickname was "Crazy” because of his crazy antics. They tacked on "moco" which "rhymed with loco and sounded good".

Popularity
This dish was featured on the "Taste of Hawai'i" episode of Girl Meets Hawai'i, a Travel Channel show hosted by Samantha Brown. The episode features the dish being served at the popular restaurant, Hawaiian Style Cafe, in Waimea together with the plate lunch, another Hawaiian specialty dish.

The loco moco was also featured on a Honolulu-based episode of the Travel Channel show Man v. Food (this episode aired in the show's second season). The host, Adam Richman, tried the dish at the Hukilau Café, located in nearby Laie. Richman also tried an off-the-menu loco moco at a San Francisco eatery called Namu Gaji on his 2014 show, Man Finds Food. In 2018, on a different episode of the revived Man v. Food, host Casey Webb tried a loaded version of the loco moco at Da Kitchen in Maui.

See also

 Garbage Plate
 Hamburg steak
 List of Hawaiian dishes
 List of regional dishes of the United States
 Nasi ambeng
 Donburi
 Silog

References

Further reading
.  A reprint of Kelly's original paper.
.

Egg dishes
Hamburgers (food)
Hawaiian fusion cuisine
Japanese fusion cuisine
National dishes
Rice dishes